The carruca or caruca was a kind of heavy plow important to medieval agriculture in Northern Europe. The carruca used a heavy iron plowshare to turn heavy soil and may have required a team of eight oxen. The carruca also bore a coulter and moldboard. It gave its name to the English carucate.

The heavy iron moldboard plow was developed in China's Han Empire in the 1st and 2nd century. Based on linguistic evidence, the carruca may have been employed by some Slavs by AD 568. It was present in Italy's Po Valley by 643 and—judging from the terminology in the —in southwestern Germany by 720.

The carruca may have been introduced to the British Isles by the Viking invasions of England in the late 9th century.

The carruca was able to turn over a furrow and it gave an opportunity to utilize the heavier soils of Northern Europe, as well as providing greater drainage; overall an important technological advancement for the medieval agricultural economy. Its use required cooperation among peasants because few would own enough oxen to pull it. The scratch plow which preceded the wheeled plough had been ideal for the light sandy soils of Southern Europe, and continued in use in various places, in England, on the continent and also in the Byzantine Empire. The scratch plough tended to create square fields because the field was ploughed twice, the second time at right angles to the first. By contrast, the carruca was most efficient in oblong paddocks. Because this pattern conflicted with traditional ownership arrangements, the carruca was probably most often used when breaking uncultivated ground.

The wheeled plough in the Danish region 
The well-known Viking settlement of Danelagen testify to the enduring presence of Scandinavians on the British Isles from the 9th century onwards and the idea of Viking settlers introducing the wheeled plough may well be one of the possible congruencies of history.
Hoffs evaluation  of the Danish landscape laws take in many aspects. In the section "The cultivated land", subsection "Agricultural systems" Hoff draw up lines of agricultural development stemming a period of circa 1000 years (2nd - 12th century)—regions mentioned include Denmark, the Netherlands, North-West Germany and England.

The earliest reliable date for the wheeled plough in the Danish region is from the 11th century, at the location Sønder Vium.
Hoff comment that "These sporadic ploughmarks give no information on the structure and function of the agricultural system."

In the same section ("Agricultural systems") Hoff gathers textual evidence from the Danish landscape laws indicate usage of the wheeled plough, but also a terminological uncertainty that is later resolved - i.e. reflecting a time of transition.
The period of transition is not exactly determined by Hoff, but the period 12th-14th century may be suggested.

See also
 History of the plow
 Carucate

Literature 

 Western Civilization Sixth Edition by Jackson J. Spielvogel
 Fontana Economic History of Europe - The Middle Ages, ed C Cipolla, article by L White

References

Ploughs
Medieval agriculture